Alberto Román (born 1 June 1987 in Montevideo) is a Uruguayan rugby union player who plays as a centre for Pucaru Stade Gaulois. He was named in Uruguay's squad for the 2015 Rugby World Cup.

In September 2012, he moved to Italy along with his countryman Jerónimo Etcheverry to play for Rugby Club Valpolicella.

References

1987 births
Living people
Uruguayan rugby union players
Uruguay international rugby union players
Rugby union players from Montevideo
Rugby union centres
Expatriate rugby union players in Italy
Uruguayan expatriate rugby union players
Uruguayan expatriate sportspeople in Italy